The Bamberger triazine synthesis in organic chemistry is a classic organic synthesis of a triazine first reported by Eugen Bamberger in 1892.

The reactants are an aryl diazonium salt obtained from reaction of the corresponding aniline with sodium nitrite and hydrochloric acid and the hydrazone of pyruvic acid. The azo intermediate converts to the benzotriazine in the third step with sulfuric acid in acetic acid.

See also
 From the same inventor: the Bamberger rearrangement

References

Nitrogen heterocycle forming reactions
Heterocycle forming reactions
Name reactions